CM Panchakattimutt PU College is a pre-university college in  Lokapur, Karnataka, India. It is affiliated to Karnataka Pre-University Education Board. It is located at Mudhol Taluk, Lokapur.

References

Pre University colleges in Karnataka
Educational institutions in India with year of establishment missing